Thomas William Lemuel Prowse (August 31, 1888 – November 2, 1973) was a businessman and was the 17th Lieutenant Governor of Prince Edward Island from 1950 to 1958.

The son of Lemuel Ezra Prowse and Frances J. Stanley, he was born and educated in Charlottetown, Prince Edward Island.

He was proprietor and president of Prowse Brothers Ltd. in Charlottetown. Active in local politics, he was a councillor on Charlottetown City Council for eight years and served as the 26th mayor from 1930 to 1932.

A Liberal, he was elected to the Legislative Assembly of Prince Edward Island representing the Charlottetown Common and Royalty District in Queens County, first in the 1935 general election and again in 1943. In 1950 he was appointed lieutenant governor of the island and served for eight years.

References
Official biography

1888 births
1973 deaths
Charlottetown city councillors
Lieutenant Governors of Prince Edward Island
Mayors of Charlottetown
Prince Edward Island Liberal Party MLAs